Alan Hewitt (January 21, 1915 – November 7, 1986) was an American film, television, and stage actor. His most prominent TV roles were Detective Brennan in My Favorite Martian and the district attorney in How to Murder Your Wife.

Early years
Hewitt was born and educated  in New York City and entered Dartmouth College when he was 15, graduating in 1934. His acting debut was in a school production at age 10.

Stage
Hewitt first appeared on the New York stage in The Taming of the Shrew in 1935, starring Alfred Lunt and Lynn Fontanne. He later toured with them in that play. in 1936–37, he appeared again with Lunt and Fontanne in productions of Amphitryon 38 and The Sea Gull. His obituary in The New York Times noted that he "scored his biggest successes on Broadway in William Saroyan's Love's Old Sweet Song and John Steinbeck's The Moon Is Down."

During World War II Hewitt served in the US Army's Armed Forces Radio Service from 1943 to 1946.

Film
Among the movies Hewitt appeared in are A Private's Affair, That Touch of Mink, Days of Wine and Roses, Follow That Dream, How to Murder Your Wife, Sweet Charity, and The Barefoot Executive.

Television
Hewitt was an accomplished character actor who had a lengthy career, including parts in well-known programs, including Alfred Hitchcock Presents, Maverick, 77 Sunset Strip, Daktari, Leave It to Beaver, The Donna Reed Show, Dr. Kildare, Lost in Space, Bewitched, I Dream Of Jeannie, Hazel, The Lucy Show, F Troop, The Wild Wild West, Ironside, The Bob Newhart Show, Dennis the Menace, The Cara Williams Show,  and The Phil Silvers Show. He made four guest appearances on Perry Mason, in three of which he portrayed the murderer: in 1961 he played Bruce Sheridan in "The Case of the Wintry Wife" and Dr. Marcus Tate in "The Case of the Brazen Bequest," and in 1965 he played the role of Curt Ordway in "The Case of the Fatal Fetish".  The only episode in which he was not the murderer was 1959's "The Case of the Golden Fraud".

Actors' Equity Association
Hewitt became a member of Actors' Equity Association in 1934, gaining membership on its council in 1940. He served on the council until 1951 and was also on several committees during that span. An obituary noted, "He helped to establish the employment survey for performers in the American theater and frequently wrote letters and articles about actors' rights as professionals."

Death
Hewitt died of cancer on November 7, 1986, at Memorial Sloan Kettering Cancer Center in New York City. He was survived by his mother, Hortense B. (Baum) Hewitt (1892-1988) of Englewood, N.J., and a brother, Robert W. Hewitt (1919-2013) of Hillsdale, N.J. His father William predeceased him by about 40 years.

Papers
Hewitt's papers were donated to Dartmouth College by his estate. The material housed at the Dartmouth College Library includes "programs, scripts, clippings, sides, reviews, correspondence, playbills, photographs and tapes." It occupies 22 boxes.

Filmography

A Private's Affair (1959) - Maj. R.C. Hanley
Career (1959) - Matt Helmsley
The Absent Minded Professor (1961) - General Hotchkiss
Bachelor in Paradise (1961) - Attorney Backett
Follow That Dream (1962) - H. Arthur King
That Touch of Mink (1962) - Doctor Gruber
Days of Wine and Roses (1962) - Rad Leland
Son of Flubber (1963) - Prosecutor
The Misadventures of Merlin Jones (1964) - Professor Shattuck
How to Murder Your Wife (1965) - District Attorney
The Monkey's Uncle (1965) - Professor Shattuck
The Horse in the Gray Flannel Suit (1968) - Harry Tomis
The Brotherhood (1968) - Sol Levin
Sweet Charity (1969) - Nicholsby
The Computer Wore Tennis Shoes (1969) - Dean Collingsgood
R. P. M. (1970) - Hewlett
The Barefoot Executive (1971) - Farnsworth
Now You See Him, Now You Don't (1972) - Dean Collingsgood
The Seniors (1978) - The Inspector (final film role)

References

External links

Alan Hewitt papers, 1936-1985, held by the Billy Rose Theatre Division, New York Public Library for the Performing Arts
 The Papers of Alan Hewitt at Dartmouth College Library

1915 births
1986 deaths
Male actors from New York City
American male television actors
American male film actors
Deaths from cancer in New York (state)
20th-century American male actors